The Freeman’s dog-faced bat (Cynomops freemani), is a Central American bat species of the family Molossidae. It is endemic to Panama.

References

Cynomops
Mammals described in 2018
Bats of Central America